The Red Rock Bridge was a bridge across the Colorado River at Topock, Arizona that carried the Atlantic & Pacific Railroad.  It was built in 1890, replacing a wooden bridge dating to 1883 that was repeatedly washed out during spring flooding. It was used by the railroad until 1945 when a new bridge was built. The Red Rock Bridge was then converted to carry the automobile traffic of U.S. Route 66, and did so from 1947 until 1966 when Route 66 traffic was directed onto the Interstate 40 bridge. At that time the Red Rock Bridge was abandoned, and it was eventually dismantled in 1976.

History

In 1880, the Atlantic & Pacific railroad's Western division began construction of a line from Isleta, New Mexico, heading west to meet the Southern Pacific at Needles, California, on the western bank of the Colorado just north of Topock. The Southern Pacific was simultaneously building eastward from Mohave, California, to Needles. The line reached Kingman, Arizona, in 1882. The first bridge across the Colorado, made entirely of wood, was completed in May 1883 and the two railroads met in Needles August 9 of that year. This crossing was at Eastbridge, Arizona, three miles south of Needles. The site had no solid base on either bank.

The wooden bridge was washed away in 1884, rebuilt and again destroyed in 1886, and again in 1888. This led the railroad to seek a better bridge that could withstand the strong spring currents of the Colorado when it carried the winter snow melt. A new crossing was located about  farther south at Topock, Arizona where the bridge could be built on rock foundations.

In 1890, the railroad hired the Phoenix Iron Company to build a new bridge, one of the first steel bridges in the country. The cost was nearly $500,000 which was considered very expensive at the time. The bridge was a single-track  cantilever through-truss bridge. It was designed by John Alexander Low Waddell and was built in eighty days under Wadell's supervision. When constructed, it was the largest cantilever bridge in the country.

The bridge was built at the head of Mohave Canyon, within Topock Gorge, upon piers of red sandstone, quarried in Prescott Junction.

Because of increasing weights of trains, the bridge was strengthened in 1901 with additional stringers and heavier floor beams. Even heavier locomotives required further strengthening of the trusses in 1910.

Early use by automobiles
Automobiles using the National Old Trails Road crossed the Colorado in the early 20th century by the Needles Ferry. Flooding in 1914 disabled the ferry service, and the bridge was put into use by cars when wooden planks were laid across the railroad ties. Railroad employees allowed cars onto the bridge between scheduled train traffic. The railroad charged each motorist a toll to cross the bridge.

Wildlife Refuge
In 1941,  of the lower Colorado, from Needles to Lake Havasu City, Arizona was designated as the Havasu National Wildlife Refuge to provide habitat for migratory birds. The Red Rock Bridge was within the refuge.

Replacement
By 1945, the railroad (now the Santa Fe) constructed a new rail bridge over the Colorado. The railroad agreed to remove the Red Rock bridge at the time the replacement bridge was authorized. However, since the Old Trails Bridge was insufficient to carry the current auto and truck traffic of Route 66, it was decided that the Red Rock Bridge could be used for the roadway. Re-purposing the bridge was also less expensive than demolition. A bill, introduced by Arizona Senator Ernest McFarland on November 30, 1944 and subsequently passed by Congress authorizing the railroad to convey ownership of the bridge to the states of California and Arizona and was signed into law by President Roosevelt on January 6, 1945. Joint ownership by the states of the bridge was accepted on August 24, 1945, in the office of Arizona Governor Sidney Osborn. The railway also donated several miles of right of way leading to the bridge. The ties were removed and replaced with a concrete road deck, at an estimated cost of $60,000. California allocated $130,000 for the project, including approach work. The bridge provided a vehicular river crossing without the weight limit that was imposed at the Old Trails Bridge. The Red Rock Bridge re-opened for auto traffic on May 21, 1947. It functioned as a highway bridge for almost twenty years, until Interstate 40 was built with a new four-lane steel bridge. The old bridge was abandoned in 1966 and stood unused until it was demolished in 1976.

References

Bridges over the Colorado River
Former road bridges in the United States
Truss bridges in the United States
Bridges completed in 1890
Road bridges in Arizona
Road bridges in California
Railroad bridges in Arizona
Railroad bridges in California
Buildings and structures in Mohave County, Arizona
Buildings and structures in San Bernardino County, California
U.S. Route 66 in California
U.S. Route 66 in Arizona
Bridges on U.S. Route 66
Steel bridges in the United States
Cantilever bridges in the United States